SB19 is a five-member Filipino boy band that debuted in 2018, consisting of Josh, Pablo, Stell, Ken, and Justin. They are the first Filipino and Southeast Asian act to be nominated in Billboard Music Awards for the Top Social Artist category.

2020: Get in the Zone 
On December 3, SB19 appeared at number six on Billboard Year-End Social 50 chart, making them the first Southeast Asian act to reach the top 10 of the magazine's annual chart. On April 29, 2021, SB19 became the first Filipino and Southeast Asian act to be nominated in Billboard Music Awards for Top Social Artist along with BTS, Blackpink, Ariana Grande, and Seventeen—which BTS won. It marked the first-ever appearance of a Filipino artist in the Billboard Music Awards. On November 4, "Bazinga" entered the newly-launched Billboard Hot Trending Songs at number 14 for the 24-hour and number 20 on the weekly. SB19 is the first Filipino artist to debut a track on the chart.

2021-2022: Pagsibol 
On October 21, 2021, SB19 has been nominated as Best Southeast Asia Act at the 2021 MTV Europe Music Awards.

On December 16, 2021, National Commission for Culture and the Arts appointed SB19 as new Youth and Sentro Rizal ambassador.

On June 28, SB19 lands spots on Twitter Philippines "#WorldMusicDay" 2022 lists. The group was able to snag the top spot in the Top Music-Related Handles in the Philippines and the Top Hashtags Around Music in the Philippines lists on Twitter from May 31 to June 1. It was revealed during the celebration of Fête de la Musique (World Music Day) which aims to laud artists and communities locally and in South East Asia.

On July 19, SB19 joined the biggest name on the Teen Vogue as one of the Best Boy Bands Of All Time. SB19 is the only Filipino act on the list composed of 33 bands across different genres and generations.

On July 20, SB19 fandom "A'TIN" ends up 2nd in Billboard Fan Army Face-Off championship round against "STAY", the fandom of K-pop boyband Stray Kids. The two groups outlasted 62 other vocal fan groups. The Billboard Fan Army Face-Off past champions include two-time winners Super Junior’s E.L.F (two times), three-time clinchers T-ara’s Queens (three times), and Big Bang’s VIPs.

2022–present: WYAT (Where You At) 
On August 31, SB19 was among the "Preview's 50 Most Influential for 2022". An annual selection by Summit Media's "Preview Magazine" honoring individuals and groups that have made the biggest impacts in different fields across the realms of fashion, beauty, and art, these faces have maximized their digital platforms to champion the innate diversity of the Filipino identity.

On September 23, the boy band SB19 was on the list of "The 100 Most Powerful People in the Philippines: Wielders of Soft Power" by the Esquire Magazine. The 100 people named were a selection of people from different industries of private and public organizations who embody power: authority, control, and influence.

On October 10, JCI Batangas awarded SB19 as the "2022 Outstanding Filipino Gamechanger" on the 3rd Gawad Balisong. The JCI Batangas Gawad Balisong recognizes the diverse line up of individuals who made a notable influence to the members of the local organization and the community in the Philippines. It is a selection of Filipino gamechangers who are motivated individuals who lead to a shift whey they are thinking or doing things. They are authentic human beings who empower the community through their humble causes and stories of good.

On October 12, SB19 received an International Chartbursting Award, a special award on the 13th Star Awards for Music by the Philippine Movie and Press Club. The award was given to an artist that successfully penetrated and was on the rise in selling music and album globally. The "Alab (Burning)" from their group's debut album Get in the Zone was also nominated in the Music Video of the Year category.

Awards and nominations

International

Local

Special award(s)

Other nominations

Other accolades

State and cultural honors

Listicles

References

Awards
SB19
SB19